Minton is a village in the Canadian province of Saskatchewan within the Rural Municipality of Surprise Valley No. 9 and Census Division No. 2. It is on Highway 6 just north of its intersection with Highway 18, 19 km north of the Raymond-Regway Border Crossing on the Montana-Saskatchewan border. The village was named after Minton, Shropshire in England. The name was given by the Canadian Pacific Railway.

History 
Minton incorporated as a village on January 1, 1951.

Demographics 

Attractions 

See also 

 List of communities in Saskatchewan
 Villages of Saskatchewan

Footnotes

Villages in Saskatchewan
Division No. 2, Saskatchewan